Metka Jerman (born 23 January 1963) is a Slovenian alpine skier. She competed in two events at the 1980 Winter Olympics, representing Yugoslavia.

References

1963 births
Living people
Slovenian female alpine skiers
Olympic alpine skiers of Yugoslavia
Alpine skiers at the 1980 Winter Olympics
Skiers from Ljubljana